Yellow Dolphin Street is a solo album by pianist Tete Montoliu recorded in early 1977 and released on the Dutch label, Timeless.

Reception

Ken Dryden of AllMusic states, "Although this may be one of Tete Montoliu's more obscure recordings, it is also one of his finest".

Track listing
All compositions by Tete Montoliu except as indicated
 "Yellow Dolphin Street" - 5:58
 "Come Sunday" (Duke Ellington) - 6:48
 "I Hate You" - 4:40
 "You've Changed" (Bill Carey, Carl Fischer) - 6:52
 "Walse for Nicolien" - 3:52
 "Where Are You" (Harold Adamson, Jimmy McHugh) - 5:46
 "Napoleon" - 3:54
 "If You Could See Me Now" (Tadd Dameron) - 5:19

Personnel
Tete Montoliu – piano

References

Tete Montoliu albums
1977 albums
Timeless Records albums
Solo piano jazz albums